Jindřich Suza (12 January 1890 – 19 November 1951) was a Czech professor of botany. He specialised in lichenology and phytogeography.

Life and career
Jindřich Suza was born in Třebíč; his father Alois was a bookbinder and stationery merchant. As a child he collected beetles and butterflies, and had a drying herbarium for specimens. He studied at the grammar school in Třebíč, graduating in 1910. He decided to study botany under the influence of his teacher  and his older friend and teacher , who supplied Suza with scientific literature to further his studies. Suza chose lichenology and phytogeography as his main field of study in university. In 1911 he completed a one-year teaching course at the Teachers' Training Institute in Brno (now the ). During World War I he was on military service in Vienna. Suza's acquaintance with Alexander Zahlbruckner afforded him the opportunity to learn the local alpine flora from this prominent lichenologist.

In 1916 Suza began teaching at a middle-class school in Brno. During this time, he met another professor, who organized botanical research in Moravia. Suza helped him organize a large documentary herbarium of the Moravian Museum, and by doing became well-acquainted with the domestic flora. After the founding of Masaryk University, Podpěra was entrusted with the management of the botanical institute, and he invited Suza to assist him. Suza accepted, and in 1921 became an assistant professor in the Faculty of Science. In 1924 he graduated as a doctor of natural sciences. In 1932 he gained his habilitation in the field of systematic botany. That same year he lectured at Charles University in Prague about cryptogamy and phytogeography. In 1936 he was appointed associate professor at that institution.

After retirement, Suza continued working on floristic research. He collected a large comparative herbarium of lichens, which are now stored in the National Museum in Prague. Suza also published an exsiccata series (sets of dried herbarium specimens) titled Lichenes Bohemoslovakiae exsiccati that ran to 30 volumes.

Personal life and death
Jindřich Suza married Františka Suzová (née Pavelková) on 12 May 1920. They had one child, Mirko. Suza died on 19 November 1951.

Scientific work
One of the goals of his scientific work was to explore the flora of his native Třebíč region, so he returned there and collaborated with botanists and naturalists from Třebíč and the surrounding area. They were: the director of the school in Třebíč Ladislav Veselský, the economic administrator of the Wallenstein estates in Třebíč and Čechtín František Jičínský, the specialist teacher in Mohelná and Třebíč , and also Dvořák, who was the director of the burgher school in Mohelno. They researched the Mohelen Snake Steppe and contributed to its inclusion among nature reserves. Suza published a total of 190 scientific papers in the botanical field. One of the most important is the "Geobotanical Guide to the Serpentine Area near Mohelno" from 1928. He also collaborated with Podpěra, with whom he worked at the Moravian Museum and the Faculty of Science. Suza collected lichens in Lower Austria, Styria, Dalmatia, Bulgaria, Serbia, and Poland. Many of his studies were about saxicolous lichens (lichens that grow on rocks).

Selected publications
Suza published more than 100 works on lichenology, and about 200 about botany. Some representative works are listed:

Recognition
In his account of the history of the studies on the flora and vegetation in the Czech Republic,  called Suza, "next to A. Vězda the most productive lichenologist in the former Czechoslovakia".

Eponyms
Several fungal and lichen taxa have been named to honour Jindřich Suza. These include: Acarospora suzae ; Polyblastia suzae ; Verrucaria suzae ; Pezizella suzae ; Chaenotheca suzae ; Staurothele suzaeana ; Physcia suzae ; Pluteus suzae ; Helotium suzae ; Involucrothele suzaeana ; Dermatocarpon suzae ; Verrucaria lecideoides var. suzae ; and Arthopyrenia conoidea var. suzae .

Membership in professional organisations
Moravian Scientific Society
Royal Bohemian Society of Sciences
The learned society of Šafaříkov
Science Club in Brno

References

1890 births
1951 deaths
Czech botanists
Czech lichenologists
20th-century Czech people
People from Třebíč
Academic staff of Charles University